The 2015 AFC Champions League group stage was played from 24 February to 6 May 2015. A total of 32 teams competed in the group stage to decide the 16 places in the knockout stage of the 2015 AFC Champions League.

Draw
The draw for the group stage was held on 11 December 2014, 16:00 UTC+8, at the Petaling Jaya Hilton Hotel in Kuala Lumpur, Malaysia. The 32 teams were drawn into eight groups of four. Teams from the same association could not be drawn into the same group.

The following 32 teams (16 from West Zone, 16 from East Zone) were entered into the group stage draw, which included the 24 automatic qualifiers and the eight qualifying play-off winners, whose identity was not known at the time of the draw:

Format
In the group stage, each group was played on a home-and-away round-robin basis. The winners and runners-up of each group advanced to the round of 16.

Tiebreakers
The teams are ranked according to points (3 points for a win, 1 point for a draw, 0 points for a loss). If tied on points, tiebreakers are applied in the following order:
Greater number of points obtained in the group matches between the teams concerned;
Goal difference resulting from the group matches between the teams concerned;
Greater number of goals scored in the group matches between the teams concerned;
Greater number of away goals scored in the group matches between the teams concerned;
If, after applying criteria 1 to 4, teams still have an equal ranking, criteria 1 to 4 are reapplied exclusively to the matches between the teams in question to determine their final rankings. If this procedure does not lead to a decision, criteria 6 to 10 apply;
Goal difference in all the group matches;
Greater number of goals scored in all the group matches;
Penalty shoot-out if only two teams are involved and they are both on the field of play;
Fewer score calculated according to the number of yellow and red cards received in the group matches (1 point for a single yellow card, 3 points for a red card as a consequence of two yellow cards, 3 points for a direct red card, 4 points for a yellow card followed by a direct red card);
Team who belongs to the member association with the higher AFC ranking.

Groups
The matchdays were 24–25 February, 3–4 March, 17–18 March, 7–8 April, 21–22 April, and 5–6 May 2015.

Group A

Group B

Group C

Group D

Group E

Group F

Group G

Group H

References

External links
AFC Champions League, the-AFC.com

2